David Andrew Stremme (born June 19, 1977) is an American professional stock car racing driver.

Early career
Stremme was born in South Bend, Indiana.  His racing roots can be traced back to Midwestern short track racing, where he followed in the footsteps originally cast by his Great Uncle in the 1950s. Stremme's first stock car victory came in the early 1990s at New Paris Speedway, while behind the wheel of his mother's street stock ride. Once track officials realized that he was only 15 years old however, he was forced to temporarily give up driving.
 
Once he reached legal driving age, Stremme moved to the Midwestern short tracks scene. David is an avid race car builder and has a great understanding of the cars he races.  Being part of a racing family (father, mother, and brother) racing is his life.  During his career, he earned 24 feature wins, two Rookie of the Year titles and two track championships in just four years. From the local tracks, Stremme became a winner in the Kendall Late Model Series and soon joined American Speed Association (ASA), where he was named the 2002 ASA Rookie of the Year.

During 1998, 1999, and 2000, Stremme raced for the ISES Performance Group, Inc.  The team was made up of Stremme's racing friends and sponsored by Industrial Safety and Environmental Services, Inc.  New cars were purchased and Stremme initiated alliances with top suppliers of engines, chassis, and shock manufacturers.

In only his first start in a Kendall Late Model Series car completely assembled by Stremme at Winchester Speedway, he set a new track record and finished 4th in the race.  Subsequent to this event an even larger strategy was set forth.  Under the direction of Tris Gour, President, Industrial Safety and Environmental Services, Inc. a new car was purchased to compete in the NASCAR November Phoenix International Raceway race.  The new car was completely built by David with help from friends.  It was the first time the team had ventured significantly far away from home.

As a budget did not allow for crew chiefs or fabricators, Gour and Stremme formed an alliance with Robert Hamke. Hamke is a well renowned chassis builder, racer, and crew chief.  Although the car built was not a Hamke Chassis, Hamke accepted the opportunity to work with Stremme and the crew, and accepted the challenge based upon reference from Performance Technologies (engine builders) and the owner of LeftHander Chassis. Hamke had a great respect for the owner of LeftHander.  In addition, Performance Technologies had built several engines for both chassis builders (Hamke and Lefthander) clients.

While at Phoenix, the team qualified fourth and led several laps during the race. Stremme led the majority of the race and was passed on the last lap coming out of turn three by Scott Hansen.  Subsequent to the race, it was found that Hansen was disqualified as his car was equipped with an illegal carburetor spacer plate giving him an unfair horsepower advantage.

The local news media reported on this issue but only a financial penalty was given to Hansen.  Although upset by the loss, the ISES Performance Group, Inc. and Stremme had gained the respect of the Hansen Group.  Hansen later called upon Stremme to race his car at Winchester due to a conflict with his racing schedule.

NASCAR career

2003–2005

After signing a driver development contract with Chip Ganassi Racing, Stremme started 15th in his Busch Series debut at Nashville Superspeedway in April 2003, driving the No. 1 Dodge for Phoenix Racing, and finished 7th in the race. He finished 14th in both of his next two starts, before coming to 6th at Nazareth Speedway. He led 32 laps in that race, which were the first in his career.

He finished 4th after starting 3rd at Nashville in June, and duplicated the result at the Milwaukee Mile. He had a 10th at Kentucky and a 9th at Memphis. Stremme's worst finish that year was a 31st at Dover. Due to a contract obligation, Finch had Jamie McMurray back in the car for the final two races, and Stremme moved to Braun Racing for the remaining two races. Stremme led 48 laps at Rockingham, finishing 5th, and additionally drove the No. 30 Sport Clips Dodge home in 14th. His strong finishes in his part-time schedule was enough to secure him the 2003 Busch Series Rookie of the Year award, despite competing in only 18 of the 34 races.

Stremme raced in the No. 32 TrimSpa Dodge Intrepid in 2004. Stremme started 4th and finished 6th in the season opener at Daytona International Speedway. Despite winning his first career pole at Milwaukee, and finishing that up with a second, Stremme's team began to run mid-pack with a handful of top-10s mixed in. 
Braun Racing then made the announcement that they were going to replace Stremme with Shane Hmiel, who was just coming off a suspension. Ganassi then made a deal with FitzBradshaw Racing to secure Stremme a ride. For the remainder of the 2004 season, Stremme was to replace Casey Atwood in FitzBradshaw's U.S. Navy-sponsored No. 14 Chevrolet. For the next season, FitzBradshaw's team would begin running Dodges and Stremme would be retained to drive the No. 14 full-time. In 2005, Stremme posted five top-five finishes and finishing 13th in points, when it was announced he would run full-time in the Nextel Cup Series.

2004–2007
In June 2005, Stremme made his Cup debut in 2005 driving Ganassi's R&D No. 39 Navy Dodge at Chicagoland Speedway. He started 31st and would finish 16th in his debut. He also had finishes of 42nd at Richmond and Miami, and a 36th at Charlotte. Ganassi announced Stremme would go to the Cup series, driving the No. 40 Coors Light Dodge in 2006.

In 2006, Stremme had a best finish of 11th at New Hampshire International Speedway and Homestead-Miami Speedway. He finished 33rd in points after missing both road course races that season. In addition, he made his Craftsman Truck Series debut at Martinsville Speedway, finishing 32nd in the No. 04 Dodge for Bobby Hamilton Racing. In addition, he won his first career ARCA RE/MAX Series race at Michigan International Speedway, driving the No. 61 Hantz Group Dodge for Rusty Wallace. Despite solid equipment with Ganassi, Stremme failed to notch a single top 10 in 34 races.

Stremme followed up his disastrous rookie season with another poor season in 2007. He started 2007 starting 6th in the 49th annual Daytona 500 and went on to finish 11th. Three weeks later he would get his best career start, 2nd in the UAW-DaimlerChrysler 400 at Las Vegas Motor Speedway. In the Samsung 500 at Texas Motor Speedway he would get his first career Top 10 finish. Two weeks later he would follow that up with a career best finish, 8th in the Aaron's 499 at Talladega Superspeedway. During that season, Stremme shared driving duties of the No. 41 Wrigley Dodge Charger in the Busch Series with Ganassi teammate Reed Sorenson. It ran numerous paint schemes including Wrigley's Spearmint, Doublemint, Juicy Fruit, and Winterfresh. He was able to get his second career Busch pole at Nashville but ended up 11th in the race. In addition, he drove a part-time schedule in the No. 22 Supercuts Dodge for Fitz Motorsports.

2008–2012

He was replaced in the No. 40 Dodge by Dario Franchitti 2008 after the 2007 Indy 500 Champion was signed to drive in Sprint Cup. Stremme returned to the Nationwide Series driving for Rusty Wallace Racing, in the No. 64 Atreus Homes & Communities Chevrolet. He was originally scheduled to run a handful of races, with Chase Austin and Max Papis driving the rest of the year, but after starting the season in the top-15 in points, the schedule was modified to allow him to run every race except the road course events. He had five top-fives and sixteen top-tens, on his way to an eleventh-place points finish. In the latter portion of the year, Atreus left the team, and AVIS, Loan Star Title Loans, and the Penske Corporation became the team's new primary sponsors. He drove the No. 15 Hyprene Ergon Toyota Tundra in two Truck races that season as well, in addition to returning to the No. 40 Sprint Cup team, filling for the injured Franchitti at Talladega.

In 2009, Stremme signed to drive the No. 12 car for Penske Racing full-time in the Sprint Cup Series, replacing Ryan Newman who moved to the No. 39 car for Stewart Haas Racing. The team lost its sponsor when Verizon Wireless bought Alltel, thus negating the grandfather clause. The car was blanked similar to the Penske used in the IRL, censoring their Phillip Morris USA sponsorship with "Team Penske". Stremme nearly won the 2009 AMP Energy 500 running near the front for the lead, but a green-white checkered ruined his day, causing him to run out of gas. Throughout Stremme's season for Penske, he did not score a single top 10. Stremme was released from the contract with Penske on November 3, because their new driver for 2010, Brad Keselowski, was finished with his prior contract agreements with Hendrick Motorsports. He missed the Texas and Phoenix races and failed to qualify for the Homestead race driving for James Finch in the No. 09 car.  

Stremme attempted sixteen races with Latitude 43 Motorsports in 2010, failing to make five. Stremme attempted a select number of races with newly formed Inception Motorsports in the No. 30 Chevrolet in 2011, along with a limited Nationwide Series schedule with ML Motorsports. He ran in the Sprint Cup Series for 2012 with Inception Motorsports, switching to Toyotas.

2013
For 2013, Stremme returned to the No. 30, now Swan Racing Company, with the exception of the Daytona 500 where Michael Waltrip drove the car, renumbered for the event with No. 26. Unlike Inception Motorsports, where Stremme was a start and park driver, Swan Racing has full sponsorship.

In the Camping World Truck Series inaugural running of the Mudsummer Classic at Eldora Speedway, Stremme served as the spotter for Ken Schrader.

After only recording four top-20 finishes in the first 26 races in 2013, Stremme was released by Swan Racing following the September race at Richmond International Raceway, being replaced by Cole Whitt.

2014
Stremme was signed by Circle Sport to run the No. 33 beginning at the STP 500 at Martinsville. He attempted 12 races before being released, and has not raced in NASCAR since then.

Post-NASCAR career
In 2014, Stremme founded Lethal Chassis, a dirt modified builder.

Personal life
Stremme is married to Ashley Stremme, a model whose career in that included being Mrs. North Carolina and then Mrs. United States in 2016. She has also competed in the Better Half Dash (a charity race featuring NASCAR drivers' wives driving go-karts on the infield mini-oval at Charlotte), winning the 2013 race. She also hosts two racing radio shows, Slingin' Dirt (on Motor Racing Network) and Winged Nation.

Motorsports career results

NASCAR
(key) (Bold – Pole position awarded by qualifying time. Italics – Pole position earned by points standings or practice time. * – Most laps led.)

Sprint Cup Series

 Season still in progress 
 Ineligible for series points

Daytona 500

Nationwide Series

Camping World Truck Series

ARCA Re/Max Series
(key) (Bold – Pole position awarded by qualifying time. Italics – Pole position earned by points standings or practice time. * – Most laps led.)

References

External links
 
 

Living people
1977 births
Sportspeople from South Bend, Indiana
Racing drivers from Indiana
NASCAR drivers
ARCA Menards Series drivers
American Speed Association drivers
Chip Ganassi Racing drivers
Team Penske drivers
ARCA Midwest Tour drivers